Powelliphanta "vittatus", known as one of the amber snails, is an as yet unnamed species of large, carnivorous land snail, a terrestrial pulmonate gastropod mollusc in the family Rhytididae.

Conservation status
Powelliphanta "vittatus" is classified as Range Restricted by the New Zealand Threat Classification System.

References

 Powell A W B, New Zealand Mollusca, William Collins Publishers Ltd, Auckland, New Zealand 1979 
 New Zealand Department of Conservation Threatened Species Classification
 Department of Conservation Recovery Plans

Gastropods of New Zealand
Powelliphanta
Undescribed gastropod species
Endemic fauna of New Zealand
Endemic molluscs of New Zealand